The prime minister of Tonga (historically referred to as the premier) is the country's head of government. Tonga is a monarchy with the king, currently Tupou VI, former prime minister, as head of state. The current prime minister is Siaosi Sovaleni, who was elected on 15 December 2021 and appointed on 27 December 2021. Sovaleni was elected with 16 votes.

The office of prime minister was established by the Constitution of 1875, whose article 51 stipulates that the prime minister and other ministers are appointed and dismissed by the king.

The prime minister is assisted by the deputy prime minister.

2000s democratization

During the 2000s, the country experienced an increase in democratization. In March 2006, King Tāufaʻāhau Tupou IV appointed Feleti Sevele, a moderate member of the Human Rights and Democracy Movement, as prime minister. Sevele was the first commoner to hold this post since Shirley Waldemar Baker in 1881. All the prime ministers since Baker had been members of the nobility, or even the royal family.

In July 2008, King George Tupou V announced more substantial democratic reforms. He would abandon the essential part of his executive powers, and would henceforth follow the custom of monarchies such as the United Kingdom, exercising his prerogatives only with the prime minister's advice. In addition, he would no longer appoint the prime minister anyone he wished, but would appoint a member of the Legislative Assembly to be elected by the Legislative Assembly.

List of premiers/prime ministers of Tonga (1876–present)

|- style="text-align:center;"
| colspan=8| Vacant (18 December 1879 – April 1881)

Timeline

See also
Tonga
Politics of Tonga
List of monarchs of Tonga
Lists of office-holders

Notes

References

External links
Prime Minister of Tonga at World Statesman Encyclopedia

Politics of Tonga
Government of Tonga
Tonga, Prime Minister of
 
Prime Minister
1876 establishments in Tonga